Major William Thomas Forshaw VC (20 April 1890 – 26 May 1943) was an English recipient of the Victoria Cross, the highest and most prestigious award for gallantry in the face of the enemy that can be awarded to British and Commonwealth forces.

Early life

Forshaw was born 20 April 1890 in Barrow-in-Furness. In civilian life Forshaw was a teacher and was teaching at the North Manchester School, a prep school for The Manchester Grammar School, immediately before the outbreak of the First World War.

Military career

When he was 25 years old, and a Lieutenant (temporary Captain) in the 1/9th Battalion, Manchester Regiment, Territorial Force during the First World War, he was awarded the Victoria Cross for his actions between 7 and 9 August 1915 in Gallipoli, Turkey at the Battle of Krithia Vineyard. The London Gazette of 9 September 1915 reported

He later achieved the rank of Major.

He died on 26 May 1943 and was buried at Touchen End, Berkshire in an unmarked grave. For many years the grave was unmarked but a new stone was erected in 1994 though not on the exact site.

His Victoria Cross and other campaign medals are displayed at the Museum of the Manchester Regiment, Ashton-under-Lyne, England in the Forshaw Room.

See also

List of Victoria Cross recipients by nationality

References

Volunteer Infantry of Ashton-under-Lyne. Robert Bonner, 2005)
Monuments to Courage (David Harvey, 1999)
The Register of the Victoria Cross (This England, 1997)
VCs of the First World War - Gallipoli (Stephen Snelling, 1995)

External links
Location of grave and VC medal (Berkshire)
News Item (grave search culminating in erection and dedication of a headstone)
The Ashton Territorials, 9th Battalion of the Manchester Regiment during WWI
Manchester Grammar School News Item (making of documentary featuring Forshaw's story)
William Thomas Forshaw (more detail and links)
Tameside Council

1890 births
1943 deaths
British Army personnel of World War I
Manchester Regiment officers
British Gallipoli campaign recipients of the Victoria Cross
People from Barrow-in-Furness
British Army recipients of the Victoria Cross
British Indian Army officers
British Home Guard officers
Military personnel from Lancashire